The Battle of Dos Ríos was fought in Cuba during its war of independence from Spain.

History
José Martí died fighting in the battle of Dos Ríos (near Palma Soriano). He was leading a group of rebels against the Spanish royalist army in the first skirmish in Cuba's struggle for independence from Spain (see History of Cuba). An attempt to recover Martí's body was made by the rebels but the Spanish forces were too strong. Spanish forces buried José Martí; the body was subsequently exhumed and reburied with an elaborate funeral in Santiago de Cuba in 1951.

References

Conflicts in 1895
Battles involving Spain
Battle of Dos Rios
Palma Soriano